{{DISPLAYTITLE:Delta2 Telescopii}}

Delta2 Telescopii is a blue-white-hued binary star system in the southern constellation of Telescopium. It is faintly visible to the naked eye, having an apparent visual magnitude of 5.05. The distance to this system, as determined with an annual parallax shift of 2.73 mas, is roughly 1,200 light-years. At that distance, the visual magnitude of the star is diminished by an extinction of 0.36 due to interstellar dust. The pair have an orbital period of 21.7 days and an eccentricity of 0.22. For the merged stellar classification, Houk (1978) gives B3 IV/V, while Levato (1975) lists a more evolved class of B3 III. It appears to be a relatively young system, barely 40 million years old.

References

B-type giants
B-type subgiants
Spectroscopic binaries
Telescopii, Delta
Telescopium (constellation)
170523
090853
6938
Durchmusterung objects